Coneo may refer to:

People
 Amanda Coneo (born 1996), Colombian volleyball player
 Gabriela Coneo (born 1993), Colombian volleyball player
 Muriel Coneo (born 1987), Colombian middle-distance runner

Places
 Coneo, Colle di Val d'Elsa, Italy